State Route 167 (SR-167) is a north–south  state highway in Morgan and Weber counties in northern Utah, United States, that connects Weber Canyon at Interstate 84 (I-84), west of Mountain Green, with the Ogden Valley, near Huntsville. Nearly the entire route comprises Trappers Loop Road.

Route description

At this point, the route makes a turn to the north, becoming Trappers Loop Road, which begins to climb into the mountains separating Weber Canyon and the Ogden Valley.

From here, the route winds its way back downhill, to the north, making its way towards the Ogden Valley area. Just before the route enters the valley near Huntsville, it exits the Uinta-Wasatch-Cache National Forest (the entire southern portion of the route lies in the national forest). The route then terminates at the intersection with Utah State Route 39, just south of Pineview Reservoir.

History
The old Trappers Loop Road from the former Utah State Route 5 in Mountain Green to SR-39 near Huntsville was designated State Route 85 in 1935, and decommissioned in 1945. SR-167 was created in 1985 along the same road, from I-84 near Mountain Green to SR-39 south of Huntsville. At the same time, the Utah State Legislature allocated funding for the Utah Department of Transportation (UDOT) to reconstruct the route to state highway standards. In 1987, the route was realigned to this location, where the new road was under construction. The old road would continue to be operated and maintained by UDOT until 1989, when the new road had been completed and UDOT relinquished the road back to Morgan and Weber counties. In 1990, the route was extended from its southern terminus, westward to the eastbound Mountain Green Interchange off-ramp on I-84.

Major intersections

See also

 List of state highways in Utah

References

External links

 Highway Reference Information: 0167P (PDF)
 State Road Resolutions: Route 167 (PDF)
 Route 167 on Dan Stober's Utah Highways (as archived by the Wayback Machine)

167
 167
 167